Hullo Healo is a musical comedy by Australian actor and screenwriter Dion Titheradge and composer Kenneth Duffield.

After a local try-out in Duffield's home town of Adelaide in 1924 (under the name Healo), the musical was produced professionally in Adelaide in 1926 before moving to the Palace Theatre in Sydney in 1927.

References

1926 musicals
Australian musicals